Mutdapilly is a rural locality in south-east Queensland, Australia. It is split between the local government areas of Scenic Rim Region and City of Ipswich.

Geography 
Mutdapilly is centrally divided by the north/south running Cunningham Highway.  The eastern boundary follows Warrill Creek. 

There is one of fifteen air quality monitoring stations in the region located at Mutdapilly.

History

The name Mutdapilly is believed to be a combination word from the Yuggera language (Yugarabul dialect) where mudtherri means  sticky or muddy and pilly means gully.  The name was given by Captain Patrick Logan on 9 June 1827.

Local farmer, Mr Denman, donated 2 acres of land to build a school. The Normanby State School and teacher's residence was opened on 27 April 1874; the first head teacher was John Stanfell Clowes who served at the school until 31 July 1876. The school was renamed Mutdapilly State School on 1 April 1968.

St Aidan's Church of England was built in Mutdapilly in 1921. It was a timber church building, designed by Charles Chauvel (the Australian filmmaker). It was dedicated on Easter Monday 15 April 1922 by Coadjutor Bishop Henry Le Fanu. The church closed in 1974 and the building is now used as a residence. It is at 3994 Cunningham Highway.

Education 
Mutdapilly State School is a government primary (Prep-6) school for boys and girls at 4 Mutdapilly-Churchbank Weir Road. In 2018, the school had an enrolment of 29 students with 6 teachers (3 full-time equivalent) and 5 non-teaching staff (3 full-time equivalent).

There are no secondary schools in Mutdapilly. The nearest secondary schools are Rosewood State High School in Rosewood to the north-west and Bremer State High School in Ipswich to the north-east.

Heritage listings 
Heritage listings for Mutdapilly include:
 4 Mutdapilly-Churchbank Weir Road: Mutdapilly State School

Notable residents
 Charles Chauvel, early Australian filmmaker

References

Further reading

External links
}

City of Ipswich
Scenic Rim Region
Populated places established in 1827
1827 establishments in Australia
Localities in Queensland